John Brown (13 December 1821 – 23 April 1896) was an Australian politician.

He was born at Cattai Creek near Windsor to farmer David Brown and Mary Elizabeth McMahon. A pastoralist, he married Sarah Alcorn in 1848; they had eight children. In 1880 he was elected to the New South Wales Legislative Assembly for Patrick's Plains, but he did not re-contest in 1882. Brown died at Jerry's Plains in 1896.

References

 

1821 births
1896 deaths
Members of the New South Wales Legislative Assembly
19th-century Australian politicians